Liu Baoshan (8 August 1817 – 10 August 1894), better known by his stage name Liu Gansan, was a Qing dynasty Peking opera artist based in Beijing, who specialized in Chou roles, or clowns. He was well-known for playing ugly women and making ad-lib comments in his roles to poke fun at the powerful. He was from Tianjin.

Once, when he was performing in the Forbidden Palace before Empress Dowager Cixi and the Guangxu Emperor, he made a joke to remind the empress dowager that the emperor was standing without a seat. On another occasion, he ridiculed Prince Dun, Prince Gong, and Prince Chun. He received a beating because of it.

In popular culture
Actor Xia Yu starred as Liu Gansan in the 2002 comedy TV series The Best Clown Under Heaven (天下第一丑).

References

Chinese male Peking opera actors
Male actors from Tianjin
19th-century Chinese male actors
Chinese male comedians
Female impersonators in Peking opera
Singers from Tianjin
1817 births
1894 deaths
Chou actors
19th-century comedians